Events from the year 1966 in Japan. Under the Japanese calendar, this year is known as Shōwa 41.

Incumbents
Emperor: Hirohito
Prime Minister: Eisaku Satō (Liberal Democratic)
Chief Cabinet Secretary: Tomisaburo Hashimoto until August 1, Kiichi Aichi until December 3, Kenji Fukunaga
Chief Justice of the Supreme Court: Kisaburo Yokota until August 5, Masatoshi Yokota from August 6
President of the House of Representatives: Kikuchirō Yamaguchi until December 3, Kentarō Ayabe until December 26
President of the House of Councillors: Yūzō Shigemune

Governors
Aichi Prefecture: Mikine Kuwahara 
Akita Prefecture: Yūjirō Obata 
Aomori Prefecture: Shunkichi Takeuchi 
Chiba Prefecture: Taketo Tomonō 
Ehime Prefecture: Sadatake Hisamatsu 
Fukui Prefecture: Eizō Kita 
Fukuoka Prefecture: Taichi Uzaki
Fukushima Prefecture: Morie Kimura
Gifu Prefecture: Yukiyasu Matsuno (until 16 October); Saburō Hirano (starting 17 October)
Gunma Prefecture: Konroku Kanda 
Hiroshima Prefecture: Iduo Nagano 
Hokkaido: Kingo Machimura 
Hyogo Prefecture: Motohiko Kanai 
Ibaraki Prefecture: Nirō Iwakami 
Ishikawa Prefecture: Yōichi Nakanishi 
Iwate Prefecture: Tadashi Chida 
Kagawa Prefecture: Masanori Kaneko 
Kagoshima Prefecture: Katsushi Terazono 
Kanagawa Prefecture: Iwataro Uchiyama 
Kochi Prefecture: Masumi Mizobuchi 
Kumamoto Prefecture: Kōsaku Teramoto 
Kyoto Prefecture: Torazō Ninagawa 
Mie Prefecture: Satoru Tanaka 
Miyagi Prefecture: Shintaro Takahashi 
Miyazaki Prefecture: Hiroshi Kuroki 
Nagano Prefecture: Gon'ichirō Nishizawa 
Nagasaki Prefecture: Katsuya Sato 
Nara Prefecture: Ryozo Okuda 
Niigata Prefecture: Juichiro Tsukada (until 28 March); Shiro Watari (starting 8 May)
Oita Prefecture: Kaoru Kinoshita 
Okayama Prefecture: Takenori Kato 
Osaka Prefecture: Gisen Satō 
Saga Prefecture: Sunao Ikeda 
Saitama Prefecture: Hiroshi Kurihara 
Shiga Prefecture: Kyujiro Taniguchi (until 6 December); Kinichiro Nozaki (starting 7 December)
Shiname Prefecture: Choemon Tanabe 
Shizuoka Prefecture: Toshio Saitō 
Tochigi Prefecture: Nobuo Yokokawa 
Tokushima Prefecture: Yasunobu Takeichi 
Tokyo: Ryōtarō Azuma 
Tottori Prefecture: Jirō Ishiba 
Toyama Prefecture: Minoru Yoshida 
Wakayama Prefecture: Shinji Ono 
Yamagata Prefecture: Tōkichi Abiko 
Yamaguchi Prefecture: Masayuki Hashimoto 
Yamanashi Prefecture: Hisashi Amano

Events
January 9 - The Kanai Building fire in Kawasaki City, Kanagawa Prefecture leaves 12 dead, 14 injured.
February 4 -All Nippon Airways Flight 60 crashes into Tokyo Bay, killing all 133 people on board.
March 4 - Canadian Pacific Air Lines Flight 402 crashes while landing at night with poor visibility at Tokyo International Airport, with 64 out of 72 on board killed. 
March 5 - BOAC Flight 911 crashes while encountering severe Clear-air turbulence over Mount Fuji shortly after taking off from Tokyo International Airport, killing all 124 on board.
 March 11 – A spa hotel caught fire in Minakami, Gunma Prefecture, causing 30 deaths, 29 injuries, according to Japan Fire and Disaster Management Agency official confirmed report.
 March 25 – Hachinohe Rinkai Line was opened.
April 1 - Japan switches to the Metric system.
April 26 - Japan's biggest postwar public transportation strike.
August 22 – Frontier Tea Product Manufacturing, as predecessor of Ito En founded in Shizuoka City.
September 25 – Two typhoons Helen and Ida landed in Japan on same days, according to Japanese government official confirmed report, total 317 persons were human fatalities with 824 persons were hurt.
November 11 - All Nippon Airways Flight 533 crashes into the Seto Inland Sea, killing all 50 on board.
Undated
Yamanashi Women's Junior College is founded.
Japanese birth rates plummeted due to the superstition that girls born in the year of the Fire Horse will grow up to kill their husbands.

Births
 January 5 - Yuri Amano, voice actress
 January 17 - Jyoji Morikawa, author and illustrator
 January 17 - Hiroko Mita, actress
 January 28 - Seiji Mizushima, anime director
 January 31 - Nobuyuki Hoshino, former professional baseball pitcher
 February 4 - Kyōko Koizumi, actress and singer
 February 5 - Maiko Kawakami, actress
 March 7 - Atsushi Sakurai, singer (Buck-Tick)
 April 3 - Mina Tominaga, voice actress
 April 19 - El Samurai, professional wrestler
 April 27 - Yoshihiro Togashi, author and illustrator
 June 26 - Yūko Minaguchi, voice actress
 July 11 - Kentaro Miura, manga artist (died 2021)
 July 15 - Masatoshi Nagase, actress
 July 25 -  Wataru Takagi, voice actor
 July 28 - Shikao Suga, singer
 August 4 - Kensuke Sasaki, professional wrestler
 August 14 - Honami Suzuki, actress
 August 30 - Mikako Kotani, former synchronised swimming athlete
 September 2 - Yu Hayami, singer and actress
 September 11 - Kiko, Princess Akishino, wife of Fumihito, Prince Akishino
 October 8 - Toshiro Yufune, former professional baseball pitcher
 October 27 - Masanobu Takashima, actor
 October 31 - Koji Kanemoto, professional wrestler
 November 2 - Yoshinari Ogawa, professional wrestler
 November 6 - Kae Araki, voice actress
 November 13 - Mieharu, actor
 November 28 - Narumi Yasuda, actress
 December 12 - Último Dragón, professional wrestler
 December 17 - Yuko Arimori, former marathon runner
 December 22 - Sayuri Kokusho, actress
 December 27 - Masahiro Fukuda, former footballer

Deaths
 January 10 - Nishizō Tsukahara, admiral (b. 1887)
 March 6 - Michitaro Totsuka, admiral (b. 1890)
 April 23 - George Ohsawa, dietist, founder of Macrobiotics (b. 1893)
 June 15 – Sankichi Takahashi, admiral (b. 1882)
 July 12 - D.T. Suzuki, philosopher (b. 1870)
 November 9 - Jisaburō Ozawa, admiral (b. 1886)
 November 14 - Zengo Yoshida, admiral (b. 1885)

See also
 1966 in Japanese television
 List of Japanese films of 1966

References

 
1960s in Japan
Years of the 20th century in Japan